Neversink is a town in Sullivan County, New York, United States. The population was 3,366 at the 2020 census.

The Town of Neversink is in the northeastern corner of the county. The Neversink River that flows through the town is claimed to be the birthplace of American fly fishing.

History 
The town was formed from the Town of Rochester in Ulster County, New York in 1798 before Sullivan County was formed. The Town of Rockland was created from part of Neversink in 1809, and part of Neversink was used to make the newer Town of Fallsburg in 1826. When the Neversink and Rondout reservoirs were built, as part of the New York City water supply system, many communities were submerged. The communities of Old Neversink and Bittersweet were lost to form the Neversink Reservoir, while Eureka, Montela, and Lackawack were lost to form the Rondout Reservoir.

In 1935, the town passed a dry law prohibiting the sale of alcoholic beverages, which remained in effect despite repeated efforts to repeal it. The town partially lifted the ban in 2015, allowing alcohol in restaurants but retaining the ban on sales in convenience stores.

Geography
Part of the town is in the Catskill Park. The northern and eastern town lines are on the border of Ulster County.

Demographics

2000
As of the census of 2000, there were 3,553 people, 1,346 households, and 1,008 families residing in the town. The population density was 42.8 people per square mile (16.5/km2). There were 1,960 housing units at an average density of 23.6 per square mile (9.1/km2). The racial makeup of the town was 96.93% White, 0.56% African American, 0.23% Native American, 0.23% Asian, 0.65% from other races, and 1.41% from two or more races. Hispanic or Latino of any race were 2.20% of the population.

There were 1,346 households, out of which 35.7% had children under the age of 18 living with them, 61.3% were married couples living together, 9.3% had a female householder with no husband present, and 25.1% were non-families. 21.0% of all households were made up of individuals, and 8.7% had someone living alone who was 65 years of age or older. The average household size was 2.64 and the average family size was 3.06.

In the town, the population was spread out, with 28.1% under the age of 18, 5.6% from 18 to 24, 28.7% from 25 to 44, 25.4% from 45 to 64, and 12.2% who were 65 years of age or older. The median age was 38 years. For every 100 females, there were 96.1 males. For every 100 females age 18 and over, there were 95.4 males.

The median income for a household in the town was $45,174, and the median income for a family was $55,075. Males had a median income of $40,744 versus $22,031 for females. The per capita income for the town was $19,260. About 8.7% of families and 11.3% of the population were below the poverty line, including 14.3% of those under age 18 and 13.7% of those age 65 or over.

Communities and locations in Neversink 

Aden – A hamlet in the northern part of the town.
Bittersweet – A community lost when the Neversink reservoir was constructed.
Bradley – A hamlet on the southwestern side of the Neversink Reservoir, on the border of the Town of Liberty.
Claryville – A hamlet by the northern town line.
Curry – A hamlet west of Unionville.
Eureka – A community now covered by the Rondout Reservoir.
Grahamsville – A hamlet east of Neversink village, near the Rondout Reservoir.
Lowes Corners – A location north of the Rondout Reservoir.
Neversink – The hamlet of Neversink was built above the reservoir after the original community, also known as "Neversink Flats", was  inundated by the Neversink Reservoir. The community is on Route 55.
Neversink Reservoir – A reservoir centrally located in the town.
Rondout Reservoir – A reservoir partly in the eastern area of the town.
Unionville – A hamlet west of Grahamsville.
Willowemoc – A hamlet, formerly called "Willowcanoe", near the western town line.

Notable person

Conor Crickmore (born 1970), American farmer, educator, and tool designer

References

External links
 
 Town website
  Neversink information and history

Neversink River
Towns in Sullivan County, New York
1798 establishments in New York (state)